Juan de Dios Román Seco (17 December 1942 – 28 November 2020) was a Spanish handball coach. He served as coach for the Spain men's national handball team from 1985 to 1988 and again from 1995 to 2000. He was President of the Royal Spanish Handball Federation from 2008 to 2013.

Awards

Club Awards
Finalist in the EHF Champions League (1985, 2005)
Champion of Spain (1979, 1981, 1983, 1984, 1985, 2004)
Copa del Rey de Balonmano (1978, 1979, 1981, 1982)
Winner of the Copa ASOBAL (2004, 2005)

National Team Awards

Olympics
9th place in the 1988 Summer Olympics
Bronze Medal at the 1996 Summer Olympics
Bronze Medal at the 2000 Summer Olympics

European Men's Handball Championship
Silver Medal at the 1996 European Men's Handball Championship
Silver Medal at the 1998 European Men's Handball Championship
Bronze Medal at the 2000 European Men's Handball Championship

World Men's Handball Championship
5th place at the 1986 World Men's Handball Championship
11th place at the 1995 World Men's Handball Championship
7th place at the 1997 World Men's Handball Championship
4th place at the 1999 World Men's Handball Championship

References

1942 births
2020 deaths
Spanish handball coaches
Spanish male handball players
People from Mérida, Spain
Sportspeople from the Province of Badajoz